Cecilia McDowall (born 1951 in London, England) is a British composer, particularly known for her choral compositions.

Life and career
McDowall read music at the University of Edinburgh, continuing her studies at Trinity College of Music, London and later completing an MMus in composition. She studied with Joseph Horovitz, Robert Saxton and Adam Gorb. She has won many awards and has been short-listed seven times for the British Composer Awards. In 2014 she won the British Composer Award for her choral piece Night Flight.

In 2010, Oxford University Press signed McDowall as an 'Oxford' composer. Since 2015, she has been Visiting Composer in Dulwich College, London. In 2015, she served on the panel for a Women Composers Competition of The Arcadian Singers of Oxford.

Music
McDowall's music has been commissioned and performed by both professional and amateur choirs. 
A commission from the Portsmouth Festival Choir, The Shipping Forecast, gained her national media attention in June 2011. The work reflects the mystery and force of the sea, drawing together the poetry of Seán Street, the psalm 'They that go down to the sea in ships', and the words of the Shipping Forecast itself.

Her choral works often take their inspiration from extra-musical influences. The large scale Da Vinci Requiem was written to coincide with the 500th anniversary of Leonardo da Vinci's death. It was premiered by the Wimbledon Choral Society and the Philharmonia Orchestra at the Royal Festival Hall on 7 May 2019. The five movement cantata Everyday Wonders: The Girl from Aleppo (2018), was based on Nujeen Mustafa's biography, retold by Kevin Crossley-Holland. Night Flight was composed in 2013 to commemorate the pioneering flight of the American aviatrix, Harriet Quimby across the English Channel. Its first performance was given by the Choir of Clare College, Cambridge at the Fringe in the Fen Festival on 6 July, 2013. Another cantata, Seventy degrees below zero, was commissioned by the Scott Polar Research Institute and the City of London Sinfonia as part of the Scott 100 Festival of Events in 2012, and premiered at Symphony Hall, Birmingham on 3 February 2012.

Other choral pieces include When time is broke (Three Shakespeare Songs), written for the BBC Singers in 2016, Adoro te devote for the Westminster Cathedral Choir in 2015, and another large scale work, the Stabat Mater, for St Albans Choral Society in 2004. Also from that year, the Three Latin Motets were commissioned by the City of Canterbury Chamber Choir in 2004, and have since been recorded by the American choir Phoenix Chorale.

Although choral music dominates her output, McDowall has also composed four stage works (including the chamber opera Airbourne, 2014), orchestral music (such as Great Hills for solo violin, 2 flutes and strings, 2007, and Dance the Dark Streets, a concerto grosso with piano obbligato, 2005), and a considerable body of chamber and instrumental music (including Dream City for flute, clarinet, harp and string quartet, 2002 and the String Quartet No 1, subtitled the case of the unanswered wire, from 2004.<ref>[https://www.jstor.org/stable/3878771 Conway, Paul. "Presteigne Festival 2004" in Tempo', 'Vol. 59, No. 231 (Jan., 2005), pp. 44-45]</ref> The impressionistic Y Deryn Pur ('The Gentle Dove') was written for the 2007 Presteigne Festival and scored for oboe, violin, viola and cello.

Selected works
Orchestral and large ensemble works
 Theatre of Tango for baritone solo, violin solo and chamber orchestra (2011)
 Crossing the Bridge for string orchestra (2011)
 Radnor Songs for soprano and chamber orchestra (2009)
 Great Hills for solo violin, two flutes and string orchestra (2007)
 Rain, Steam and Speed for chamber orchestra (2006)
 Dance the Dark Streets, concerto grosso, strings and piano (2005)
 Dancing Fish for soprano saxophone and string orchestra (2005)
 Trumpet Concerto (Seraphim) for trumpet, strings and percussion (2002)
 Not Just a Place for violin and double bass solo and string orchestra (2001)

Chamber music and solo works
 Are we on the same page? string quartet (2011)
 Skerry and Fjord for trombone and piano (2010)
 Time between Tides for violin, viola and cello (2010)
 Colour of Blossoms piano trio (2009)
 Cavatina at Midnight for clarinet, cello and piano or piano trio (2008)
 Strange violin, are you following me? for violin and piano (2008)
 Y Deryn Pur, oboe quartet (2007)
 Falling Angels for cello and piano (2007)
 Colour Is the Keyboard for piano (2007)
 Mein blaues Klavier for soprano saxophone and piano (2006)
 Century Dances for oboe (flute), clarinet and bassoon (2005)
 The case of the unanswered wire, string quartet (2004)
 The Moon Dances for flute and piano (2003)
 The Night Trumpeter for trumpet and piano or ensemble (2002)
 Dream City for flute, clarinet, string quartet and harp (2002)
 Four Piano Solos (2002)
 White Fox Woman for mezzo-soprano and oboe (2002)
 Arctic Circle, for sextet (2001)
 Not Just a Place "dark memories from an old tango hall" for viola, double bass and piano (1999); also for violin, double bass and piano (2000), and flute, cello and piano (2004)
 Four Piano Solos (includes No. 3, 'Pavane', 1999)
 Eleven, for flute and piano (1999)
 Le Temps Viendra, trio for oboe, clarinet and piano (1998)
 Upstaged for violin and viola (1998)
 Piper's Dream for flute and piano (1997)
 Winter Music for wind quintet (1992)

Choral worksDa Vinci Requiem for soprano and baritone solo, SATB and orchestra (2019)Be not afeared for SATB unaccompanied (2018)
 A Time for All Seasons for solo soprano, SATB, children’s choir, piano and percussion (2016)
 A Winter's Night, Christmas cantata for SATB, brass quintet, organ & percussion (2014)
 Night Flight for SSATB and cello (2013)
 Now may we singen for SATB unaccompanied (2013)
 Northlight for SATB and chamber orchestra (2011)
 A Heavenly Song for SATB and organ (2011)
 Shipping Forecast for SATB and piano (or organ or string orchestra) (2011)
 Song of the Sea for SATB and organ (2011)
 Jesu, the very thought of Thee for SSAATTBB and organ (2010)
 Aurea luce for SATB and organ (2010)
 Alma Redemptoris Mater for SSATBB (2010)
 Deus, portus pacis for SSATB (2009)
 Ad Lucem, a Canticle of Light for SATB and organ or string orchestra (2009)
 Lonely Hearts for SSA and piano or harp (2005)
 Three Latin Motets (Ave Regina, Ave Maria and Regina Caeli) SATB (2004)
 Christus natus est for SATB and chamber orchestra (2003)
 Stabat Mater for baritone solo, children’s chorus, SATB and orchestra (2004)
 Magnificat for soprano and mezzo-soprano solo, SATB and orchestra (2003)
 A Fancy of Folksongs for SATB and piano or harp (2003)
 Ave maris stella for SATB and string orchestra (2001)

Organ
 First Flight (2019)
 O Antiphon Sequence (seven movements, 2018)
 Celebration (2014)
 George Herbert Trilogy (2010-13)
 Wo Gott den Herr nicht bei uns hällt (2011) 
 Three Antiphons (2006)

Stage works
 Airborne, chamber opera (2014)
 Deep Waters, children's opera (2000)
 Divine Pursuits, musical for schools (1995)
 King Leo, musical for schools (1993)

Selected recordings
Notable recordings of McDowall's music include:
 Sacred Choral Music (2021),  Choir of Trinity College, Cambridge, Hyperion CDA68251
 Works for Organ (2021), William Fox (organ), Lucy Humphris (trumpet), Naxos 8.579077
 A Time for All Seasons (2019), Bristol Choral Society, Delphian DCD 34242
  Laudate  (2009) CCCC, George Vass, Dutton Epoch CDLX 7230
  Spotless Rose  (2008) Phoenix Chorale, Charles Bruffy, Chandos CHSA 5066
  Stabat Mater  (2007) CCCC, Joyful Company of Singers, CDLX 7197
  Proclamation  International Celebrity Trumpet Ensemble, Brass Classics
  Seraphim  (2005) Orchestra Nova, George Vass, Dutton Epoch CDLX 7159
  Ave maris stella   (2004) CCCC, George Vass, Dutton Epoch CDLX 7146
 Piper's Dream (2002), Emma Williams, Richard Shaw, Ensemble Lumière, DXL 1033
 British Chamber Music, SOMM CD 0653 (2022) (includes Y Deryn Pur'')

References

External links
 Cecilia McDowall official website

1951 births
Living people
Alumni of the University of Edinburgh
Alumni of Trinity College of Music
British women classical composers
20th-century British composers
21st-century British composers
20th-century classical composers
21st-century British musicians
21st-century classical composers
20th-century women composers
21st-century women composers